Makonda is a surname. Notable people with the surname include:

Paul Makonda (born 1982), Tanzanian politician
Tripy Makonda (born 1990), French football player 

Surnames of African origin